Jérôme Peignot (born 1926) is a French novelist, poet, pamphleteer, and an expert in typography. The author of some thirty books, he was awarded the Prix Sainte-Beuve, took part in publishing the writings of Laure (his aunt Colette Peignot), as well as a major anthology on "Typoésie". He is the grandson of Georges Peignot, typographer and director of the foundry G. Peignot et Fils. He is also known for having launched the concept of acousmatic sound in the 1960s.

Select works 

 (First edition: Klincksieck, 1989)
 Essai. (First edition: 1974)

 Préface de Bernard Noël

 (First edition: 1993)

 (First edition: 1988)
 (First edition: 1986)

 Prix Sainte-Beuve.

References

External links
 Jérôme Peignot, official Website

1926 births
20th-century French novelists
21st-century French novelists
Living people
Writers from Paris
French typographers and type designers
20th-century French essayists
20th-century French poets
French male essayists
French male poets
French male novelists
21st-century French essayists
Prix Sainte-Beuve winners
Chevaliers of the Ordre des Arts et des Lettres
20th-century French male writers
21st-century French male writers